Inors() is a neighbourhood of Ufa, Bashkortostan. It is bordered by the Ufa River on the south and the Ufa engine-building production association teritiory on the north and Sipailovo on the west conditional. It is a residential area, containing the park, the Ufa engine-building production association, the Rezyapov Ufa number 2 thermal power station.
The population of the district is approximately 70000 people.
Inors is also a former the Bogorodskoe village.

Gallery

Transport
No.110 Inors neighbourhood → Ufa International Airport
No.74 Ufa Railway Station→ Inors neighbourhood

References

Ufa neighbourhoods